Sergio Tacchini (born 2 September 1938) is an Italian fashion designer of sportswear and former professional tennis player. The sportswear firm bearing his name is located in Bellinzago Novarese, Novara, Italy.

Tennis career 
Sergio Tacchini became a professional tennis player at age 17 by entering the Tennis Club of Milan in 1955. In 1960 he won the title of the Italian Champion over Nicola Pietrangeli. He also competed in the Davis Cup, counting five victories in singles and one in doubles in a total of fifteen matches. He took another two Italian titles in doubles, with Pietrangeli as his partner, in 1967 and 1968.

Business

In 1966, Sergio Tacchini founded Sandys S.p.A. which was to be renamed after Tacchini himself a few years later. The initial idea was to experiment with colours and fabrics to create elegant and stylish tenniswear, at a time when white dominated the players' clothes. However the project expanded to other sports such as ski, fitness, golf and sailing, as well as leisure wear. The mid-eighties saw Sergio Tacchini issue the "Dallas" tracksuit.

The firm went into bankruptcy in 2007 and was purchased in 2008 by Hong Kong Chinese businessman Billy Ngok, owner of Hembly International and associate of American businessman Ron Burkle. In 2011, the firm's annual revenue were reported to be "less than €50 million (US$71 million)." A report at the time of the firm's purchase said the price was EUR27m (US$42.3m), and that Ngok "planned to open 120 shops in mainland China in the next three years." A 2011 report said the firm had "more than 100 Tacchini stores worldwide."

Sponsorships 
Many athletes joined the Sergio Tacchini brand over the years. Most of them were well-known tennis players from the 1970s and 1980s such as Jimmy Connors, Vitas Gerulaitis, Ilie Năstase, Mats Wilander, John McEnroe, Martina Navratilova, Sergi Bruguera, Pat Cash, Gabriela Sabatini, Pete Sampras, and Martina Hingis.  Goran Ivanišević was sponsored by the firm when he won Wimbledon in 2001 and Novak Djokovic was sponsored when he won the Australian Open for the second time, and Wimbledon, in 2011. The firm has also sponsored the 1983 Italian basketball team in the European Cup, the skiers Pirmin Zurbriggen and Marc Girardelli, Formula 1 drivers such as Ayrton Senna and Carlos Reutemann and the golfer Ian Woosnam.

In the 1980s, Tacchini and Fila led in tennis sponsorship, but in the late 1980s and early 1990s, Nike and Adidas moved into, and took the lead in, sponsoring the top athletes in the sport.

At present, sponsored athletes include sailor Karine Fauconnier (Transat Jacques Vabre and Single-Handed Trans-Atlantic Race) and English cricketer Ian Bell.

Djokovic signed a 10-year deal with Tacchini in November 2009. At the time of signing, he was fourth in the ATP rankings and had won only one Grand Slam title. In 2011, he became the world No. 1 and winner of 48 of 49 matches on the professional tour. Under the terms of the deal, Djokovic receives "incentive bonuses linked to tournament wins and end-of-year rankings, ... a share of all Tacchini revenue from sales in China, and [a share of] worldwide revenue from Djokovic-branded Tacchini products." After his Wimbledon victory, he traveled with Ngok and Burkle to Serbia to discuss plans for investment, including a Tacchini plant, in the Niš area. Tacchini, however, "fell behind on the payments in 2011 as Djokovic's success triggered significant bonuses". Their association ended in May 2012.

Individually sponsored cricket players

 Sachin Tendulkar

Individually sponsored tennis players

Present

 Thomas Bosancic
 Mirza Bašić
 Barbora Strýcová
 Gilles Müller
 Igor Sijsling
 Victor Hănescu
 Ekaterina Makarova
 Martin Kližan
 Daniel Gimeno-Traver
 Tommy Robredo

Past

 Gabriela Sabatini
 David Nalbandian
 Pat Cash
 Steve Darcis
 Olivier Rochus
 Ivo Karlović
 Goran Ivanišević
 Flavia Pennetta
 Roberta Vinci
 Adrian Ungur
 Marius Copil
 Igor Andreev
 Dinara Safina
 Novak Djokovic
 Sergi Bruguera
 Tommy Robredo
 Juan Carlos Ferrero
 Robert Lindstedt
 Martina Hingis
 Pete Sampras
 John McEnroe
 Jimmy Connors
 Martina Navratilova
 Ilie Năstase

F1 Competition

 Ayrton Senna
 Carlos Reutemann

See also 
 Lacoste
 Fred Perry

References

External links 
 
 

1938 births
Living people
Fashion designers from Florence
Italian male tennis players
Sportspeople from Florence
Sportswear brands
Sporting goods manufacturers of Italy